Schmaus is a German last name that can refer to the following people:

 Willibald Schmaus (1912–1979) - Austrian Footballer
 Michael Schmaus (1897–1993) - Catholic Theologian
 Angela Schmaus (1980 - ) - Veterinarian